In the mathematical field of knot theory, a mutation is an operation on a knot that can produce different knots. Suppose K is a knot given in the form of a knot diagram. Consider a disc D in the projection plane of the diagram whose boundary circle intersects K exactly four times. We may suppose that (after planar isotopy) the disc is geometrically round and the four points of intersection on its boundary with K are equally spaced. The part of the knot inside the disc is a tangle. There are two reflections that switch pairs of endpoints of the tangle. There is also a rotation that results from composition of the reflections. A mutation replaces the original tangle by a tangle given by any of these operations. The result will always be a knot and is called a mutant of K.

Mutants can be difficult to distinguish as they have a number of the same invariants. They have the same hyperbolic volume (by a result of Ruberman), and have the same HOMFLY polynomials.

Examples
Conway and Kinoshita-Terasaka mutant pair, distinguished as knot genus 3 and 2, respectively.

References

Further reading
Colin Adams, The Knot Book, American Mathematical Society,

External links 

 A list of pairs of mutant nodes

Knot operations